Franco Manca is a sourdough Neapolitan pizza business operating around 70 pizzerias in the UK. It was founded in 2008 by Giuseppe Mascoli and Bridget Hugo. The first store opened on Market Row in Brixton Market. Initially sites were in the London area, then the company opened in Italy with a summer pizzeria on the island of Salina north of Sicily. The company has opened restaurants in English cities; Brighton, Bath, Bristol, Cambridge, Leeds and Manchester - and now Glasgow and Edinburgh in Scotland. Franco Manca has opened a pizzeria in Athens, Greece starting from January 2022.   Franco Manca was named the UK's best Italian Restaurant on Yelp. Franco Manca's menu consists of pizza with various meat and vegetarian options. It uses a traditional Neapolitan soft base.

Ownership 
In March 2015, Franco Manca was purchased by The Fulham Shore, which also owns ‘The Real Greek". The Fulham Shore is publicly listed on the London Stock Exchange AIM market and is operated by Giuseppe Mascoli, David Page, Nabil Mankarious, and David Sykes, who all have significant stakes in the company. In July 2017 they said that the uncertainty over Brexit was 'already affecting the availability of skilled European restaurant staff’. In July 2018 they stated in the company report that more than 50% of the people who worked in the business held shares in the company.

References

External links 
Official website

Pizza chains of the United Kingdom
British companies established in 2008
Restaurants established in 2008
Brixton